Abarth & C. S.p.A. is an Italian racing and road car maker and performance division founded by Italo-Austrian Carlo Abarth in 1949. Abarth & C. S.p.A. is owned by Stellantis through its Italian subsidiary. Its logo is a shield with a stylized scorpion on a yellow and red background.

History

1949: Abarth & C.

Carlo Abarth was sporting director of the Cisitalia  racing team starting in 1947. The following year, the manufacturer folded, and founder Piero Dusio flew to Argentina.
Abarth, funded by Armando Scagliarini, took over Cisitalia's assets and on 31 March 1949, Abarth & C. was founded in Bologna. Carlo's astrological sign, Scorpio, was chosen as the company logo.
From the Cisitalia liquidation, Abarth obtained five 204 sports cars (two complete Spiders and three unfinished), a D46 single-seater, and various spares. The Cisitalia 204s were immediately rechristened Abarth Cisitalia 204A. Abarth proceeded to build and race a series of sports cars developed from these last Cisitalia cars. In addition to Guido Scagliarini, the "Squadra Abarth" racing team lined up celebrated drivers, including Tazio Nuvolari, Franco Cortese, and Piero Taruffi. Notably, Tazio Nuvolari made his last appearance in racing at the wheel of an Abarth 204A, winning its class in the Palermo–Monte Pellegrino hillclimb on 10 April 1950. Alongside racing, the company's main activity was producing and selling accessories and performance parts for Fiat, Lancia, Cisitalia, and Simca cars, like inlet manifolds and silencers.

On 9 April 1951, the company's headquarters were moved to Turin; Abarth began his well-known association with Fiat in 1952, when it built the Abarth 1500 Biposto on Fiat mechanicals.

In the 1960s, Abarth was successful in hillclimbing and sports-car racing, mainly in classes from 850 to 2000 cc, competing with Porsche 904 and Ferrari Dino. Hans Herrmann was a factory driver from 1962 until 1965, winning the 500 km Nürburgring in 1963 with Teddy Pilette.

Abarth promised Johann Abt that he could race a factory car free if he won all the races he entered. Abt almost succeeded: of the 30 races he entered, Abt won 29 and finished second once. Abt later founded Abt Sportsline.

Abarth produced high-performance exhaust pipes, diversifying into tuning kits for road vehicles, mainly for Fiat. A racing exhaust was produced for the 1950s Lambretta models "D" and "LD". Original Abarth LD exhausts are now valuable collectors' items. Reproductions are available, which carry the Abarth name; how Fiat feels about this is not known. Lambretta even held several 125 cc motorcycle land speed records during the 1950s due partly to the exhaust that Abarth developed for them.

Abarth also helped build sports or racing cars with Porsche and Simca.

1971: Fiat takeover
Carlo sold Abarth to Fiat on 31 July 1971. The acquisition was not made public until 15 October. As Fiat was not interested in the Reparto Corse racing operations, these were taken over by Enzo Osella. Osella obtained cars, spares, technicians, and drivers (amongst them Arturo Merzario), and continued the racing activity, founding the Osella racing team. Thus ended for Abarth the days of sport prototype and hillclimb racing.

Under Fiat ownership, Abarth became the Fiat Group's racing department, managed by engine designer Aurelio Lampredi. Abarth prepared Fiat's rally cars, including the Fiat 124 Abarth Rally and 131 Abarth.
In December 1977, in advance of the 1978 racing season, the beforehand competing Abarth and Squadra Corse Lancia factory racing operations were merged by Fiat into a single entity named EASA (Ente per l'Attività Sportiva Automobilistica, Organization for Car Sports Racing Activities). Cesare Fiorio (previously in charge of the Lancia rally team) was appointed director, while Daniele Audetto was sporting director; the EASA headquarters were set up in Abarth's Corso Marche (Turin) offices.
The combined racing department developed the Lancia Beta Montecarlo Turbo Group 5 racing car which won the 1980 World Championship for Makes and the 1981 World Endurance Championship of Makes. It also created the Lancia Rally 037 Group B rally car, which won for Lancia the 1983 World Manufacturers' Championship).

On 1 October 1981, Abarth & C. ceased to exist, and was replaced by Fiat Auto Gestione Sportiva, a division of the parent company specialised in the management of racing programmes that would remain in operation through to the end of 1999, when it changed to Fiat Auto Corse S.p.A. 

Some commercial models built by Fiat or its subsidiaries Lancia and Autobianchi were co-branded Abarth, including the Autobianchi A112 Abarth, a lightweight and inexpensive "boy racer". The A112 Abarth was introduced with a 58 hp engine, soon followed by a 7 hp one, and a specific "A112 Abarth trophy" was run from 1977 to 1984.

In the 1980s, Abarth name was mainly used to mark performance cars, such as the Fiat Ritmo Abarth 125/130 TC.

In 2000s, Fiat used the Abarth brand to designate a trim/model level, as in the Fiat Stilo Abarth.

2007: Rebirth of Abarth & C. S.p.A.
On 1 February 2007 Abarth was re-established as an independent unit with the launch of the current company, Abarth & C. S.p.A., controlled 100% by Fiat Group Automobiles S.p.A., the subsidiary of Fiat S.p.A. dealing with the production and selling of passenger cars and light commercial vehicles.

The first models launched were the Abarth Grande Punto and the Abarth Grande Punto S2000. The brand is based in the Officine 83, part of the old Mirafiori engineering plant. The CEO as of 2022 is Olivier François.

In 2015, Abarth's parent company was renamed FCA Italy S.p.A., reflecting the incorporation of Fiat S.p.A. into Fiat Chrysler Automobiles that took place in the previous months.

Yamaha XSR900 Abarth
In 2017, Abarth collaborated with Yamaha to produce a limited-edition motorcycle, the "Sport Heritage café racer special", named the XSR900 Abarth. It is based on the Yamaha XSR900 847 cc inline-triple neo-retro standard.

Production

Current models

Cars produced by Abarth 

 Fiat-Abarth 500
 Fiat-Abarth 750
 Fiat-Abarth 1000 TC (Fiat 600 based)
 Fiat-Abarth 850 TC
 Abarth 1100 Scorpione Spider (Boano)
 Abarth 1500 Biposto
 Abarth Simca 2000 – coupé
 Abarth 204A
 Abarth 205A Berlinetta
 Alfa Romeo Abarth 2000 Coupe
 Abarth 207A Spyder Corsa Boano
 Abarth 208A Spyder Boano
 Abarth 209A Coupé Boano
 Abarth 210A Spyder Boano
 Porsche 356 B Carrera GTL Abarth
 Abarth Simca 1300 GT
 Fiat-Abarth OT1000
  Fiat-Abarth 1000 OTR Berlinetta Bertone
 Fiat-Abarth OT1600
 Fiat-Abarth OT 2000 Competition Coupé
 Fiat-Abarth 750 Zagato
 Fiat-Abarth 2200
 Fiat-Abarth 750 Spider Allemano
 Fiat-Abarth 2400
 Fiat Abarth 1000 TCR Berlina
 Abarth 215A Coupé Bertone
 Abarth 216A Spyder Bertone
 Autobianchi A112 Abarth
 Fiat-Abarth 595 SS
 Fiat-Abarth 695 SS
 Abarth OT 1300
 Abarth Monomille
 Abarth Grand Prix/Scorpione
 Abarth 3000 Prototipo
 Fiat Ritmo 125/130 TC Abarth
 Fiat Abarth 124 Rally
 Fiat 131 Abarth Rally
 Lancia Rally 037

Cars not produced by Abarth but with Abarth badges 
 Fiat Bravo GT/HGT (Abarth)
 Fiat Stilo 2.4 Abarth
 Fiat Punto HGT (Abarth)
 Fiat Cinquecento Sporting (Abarth)
 Fiat Seicento Sporting (Abarth)

Cars produced under Abarth & C. S.p.A. (2007–) 
 Abarth 500 / Fiat 500 Abarth (NA)
 Abarth 595
 Abarth 695
 Abarth Grande Punto
 Abarth Punto Evo
 Abarth 124 Spider / Fiat 124 Spider Abarth (NA)
Fiat Abarth Punto

Cars produced with Abarth tuning 

 Fiat 500 TwinAir byAbarth
 Fiat 500S by Abarth
 Fiat Avventura Powered by Abarth
 Fiat Urban Cross Powered by Abarth
 Fiat 124 Spider Elaborazione Abarth (cancelled)
 Fiat Fastback Limited Edition Powered by Abarth

Cars produced by other manufacturers with involvement from Abarth 
 Lancia Delta S4 for Group B – Helped to engineer the engine which utilised a supercharger and turbocharger.

Cars produced under Fiat Corse – N Technology named Abarth 
 Fiat Punto Abarth (rally version only)
 Fiat Cinquecento 900 Trofeo kitcar (teams had to build up their own rallycar from Fiat N Technology derived Abarth racingparts)
 Fiat Cinquecento Sporting 1.1 Rally car
 Fiat Seicento Sporting 1.1 Rally car

Motorsport

Rally

FIA R-GT Cup
 2017 FIA R-GT Cup (Runner-up)
 2018 FIA R-GT Cup (Champion)
 2019 FIA R-GT Cup (Champion)
 2020 FIA R-GT Cup (Champion)

See also

 Cosworth
 Fiat
 Gordini
 Hennessey
 Mopar
 Saleen
 Shelby

Explanatory notes

References

External links 

 

 
Italian companies established in 1949
Auto tuning companies
Car brands
Car manufacturers of Italy
Fiat
Italian brands
Italian racecar constructors
Official motorsports and performance division of automakers
Stellantis
Turin motor companies
Vehicle manufacturing companies established in 1949